Rasmus Storm Josva Berthel Berthelsen (1827–1901)  was a Greenlandic teacher, poet, and artist. He also served as an early editor for Atuagagdliutit. He is considered important to their literary history and wrote the Greenland Christmas carol Guterput or Our God. His woodcut Starving Greenlanders is seen as an early example of social commentary in Greenland art. He is perhaps best known for the hymn-writing and also poetry being seen as perhaps the first Greenlandic author, at least of the post-Viking age.

References 

Christian hymnwriters
Greenlandic artists
Greenlandic poets
Greenlandic writers
People from Qeqqata
1827 births
1901 deaths
Greenlandic Christians